Lobonyx aeneus is a species of soft-winged flower beetles in the family Prionoceridae, found in the Iberian Peninsula and North Africa.

References

External links

 

Cleroidea